Mónica Alicia Clapp Jiménez Labora is a mathematician at the Universidad Nacional Autónoma de México (UNAM) known for her work in nonlinear partial differential equations and algebraic topology.

Life and work
Clapp was born in Mexico City. She graduated from UNAM in 1974. Clapp then graduated with her Ph.D from Heidelberg University in 1979, and has been a faculty member at UNAM since that time.

Clapp has been an editor of the journals Boletín de la Sociedad Matemática Mexicana and Aportaciones Matemáticas.

Awards and honors
In 2012, Clapp became a fellow of the American Mathematical Society. She is also a member of the Mexican Academy of Sciences.

Selected publications
 Clapp, Mónica; Puppe, Dieter Invariants of the Lusternik-Schnirelmann type and the topology of critical sets. Transactions of the American Mathematical Society 298 (1986), no. 2, 603–620.
 Clapp, Mónica; Puppe, Dieter Critical point theory with symmetries. Journal für die reine und angewandte Mathematik 418 (1991), 1–29.
 Bartsch, Thomas; Clapp, Mónica Critical point theory for indefinite functionals with symmetries. Journal of Functional Analysis 138 (1996), no. 1, 107–136.
 Castro, Alfonso; Clapp, Mónica The effect of the domain topology on the number of minimal nodal solutions of an elliptic equation at critical growth in a symmetric domain. Nonlinearity 16 (2003), no. 2, 579–590.

References

20th-century Mexican mathematicians
21st-century Mexican mathematicians
Mexican women mathematicians
Fellows of the American Mathematical Society
Living people
National Autonomous University of Mexico alumni
Heidelberg University alumni
Academic staff of the National Autonomous University of Mexico
20th-century women mathematicians
21st-century women mathematicians
Year of birth missing (living people)
Mexican expatriates in Germany
Members of the Mexican Academy of Sciences